Gerry Ó Colmáin (1924 – 3 November 2008) was an Irish boxer. He competed in the men's heavyweight event at the 1948 Summer Olympics.

References

1924 births
2008 deaths
Irish male boxers
Olympic boxers of Ireland
Boxers at the 1948 Summer Olympics
Place of birth missing
Heavyweight boxers